The 47th annual Berlin International Film Festival was held from 13 to 24 February 1997. The Golden Bear was awarded to Canadian-American film The People vs. Larry Flynt directed by Miloš Forman. The retrospective dedicated to Austrian film director G. W. Pabst was shown at the festival.

Jury

The following people were announced as being on the jury for the festival:
 Jack Lang, politician (France) - Jury President
 Hark Bohm, actor, director and screenwriter (Germany)
 Férid Boughedir, director, screenwriter and producer (Tunisia)
 Maggie Cheung, actress and model (Hong Kong)
 Fred Gronich, senior executive of the MPAA (United States)
 David Hare, director, screenwriter and playwright (United Kingdom)
 Per Holst, producer (Denmark)
 Boleslaw Michalek, screenwriter and film critic (Poland)
 Humberto Solás, director and screenwriter (Cuba)
 Marianne Sägebrecht, actress (Germany)
 Ning Ying, director (China)

Films in competition
The following films were in competition for the Golden Bear and Silver Bear awards:

Key
{| class="wikitable" width="550" colspan="1"
| style="background:#FFDEAD;" align="center"| †
|Winner of the main award for best film in its section
|}

Awards

The following prizes were awarded by the Jury:
 Golden Bear: The People vs. Larry Flynt by Miloš Forman
 Silver Bear – Special Jury Prize: He liu by Tsai Ming-liang
 Silver Bear for Best Director: Eric Heumann for Port Djema
 Silver Bear for Best Actress: Juliette Binoche for The English Patient
 Silver Bear for Best Actor: Leonardo DiCaprio for Romeo + Juliet
 Silver Bear for an outstanding single achievement: Zbigniew Preisner for The Island on Bird Street
 Silver Bear for an outstanding artistic contribution: Raúl Ruiz for Généalogies d'un crime
 Alfred Bauer Prize: Romeo + Juliet
 Honourable Mention:
 Jordan Kiziuk for The Island on Bird Street
 Das Leben ist eine Baustelle by Wolfgang Becker
 Anna Wielgucka for Panna Nikt
 Get on the Bus by Spike Lee
 Blue Angel Award: Secretos del corazón by Montxo Armendáriz
 Honorary Golden Bear: Kim Novak
 Berlinale Camera:
 Lauren Bacall
 Ann Hui
 Armin Mueller-Stahl
 Franz Seitz

References

External links
47th Berlin International Film Festival 1997
1997 Berlin International Film Festival
Berlin International Film Festival:1997 at Internet Movie Database

47
1997 film festivals
1997 in Berlin
1997 in German cinema
1997 festivals in Europe
February 1997 events in Europe